Thomas Lewknor (by 1529 – will proven 1571), of Alvechurch, Worcestershire, was an English politician.

He was a Member (MP) of the Parliament of England for Ripon in 1558.

References

1571 deaths
English MPs 1558
People from Alvechurch
Year of birth uncertain
Politicians from Worcestershire